Columbus Council may be:

Columbus Council (Georgia)
Columbus Council (Ohio)